Jeanne-Paule Marie "Jeannine" Deckers (17 October 1933 – 29 March 1985), better known as  and often called The Singing Nun in English-speaking countries, was a Belgian singer-songwriter and a member of the Dominican Order in Belgium as Sister Luc Gabriel. She acquired widespread fame in 1963 with the release of the Belgian French song "Dominique", which topped the US Billboard Hot 100 and other charts. Owing to confusion over the terms of the recording contract, she was reduced to poverty, and also experienced a crisis of faith, quitting the order, though still remaining a Catholic. She died by suicide with her lifelong partner, Annie Pécher.

Early years 
She was born Jeanne-Paule Marie Deckers, in Laeken, Brussels, Belgium, in 1933, the daughter of a pâtisserie owner, and was educated in a Catholic school in Brussels. Her mother thought of her as a "tomboy" and was pleased when she decided to join the all-girl Guides Catholiques de Belgique (GCB). When she was fifteen she had a premonition that she would become a nun. She became an avid Girl Guide who bought her first guitar to play at Guide evening events. While studying for three years after high school, to obtain a diploma for teaching sculpture, she considered dedicating her life to religion in a Catholic convent. From the age of 21, between 1954 and 1959, she taught sculpture to youngsters. At scout camp in the summer of 1959 she met sixteen-year-old Annie Pécher, with whom she would develop a close relationship. She became convinced, however, that her new teaching profession did not suit her and she resigned. In September 1959 she entered the Missionary Dominican Sisters of Our Lady of Fichermont, headquartered in the city of Waterloo, where she took the religious name "Sister Luc Gabriel".

Beginning of fame 
While in the convent, Sister Luc Gabriel wrote, sang, and casually performed her own songs, which were so well received by her fellow nuns and visitors that her religious superiors encouraged her to record an album, which visitors and retreatants at the convent would be able to purchase.

In 1962, the album was recorded in Brussels at Philips; in 1963 the single "Dominique" became an international hit, and her album sold nearly two million copies. She gave several live concerts and appeared on The Ed Sullivan Show on television on 5 January 1964. "Dominique" was the first song by a Belgian artist to be a number one hit single in the United States. The song's chorus refrain "Dominique, nique, nique" was the source of some unintended amusement amongst French listeners as the word "niquer" is short for "fornicate", with "nique" the equivalent of "fuck"; Deckers was unaware of the connotation, as were the other Belgian Catholics of that era.

Sister Luc Gabriel found it difficult, however, having to live up to her publicity as "a true girl scout," always happy and in a good mood. "I was never allowed to be depressed," she remembered in 1979. "The mother superior used to censor my songs and take out any verses I wrote when I was feeling sad."

In 1963 the General Music Company published a book of 15 Soeur Sourire songs with English lyrics provided by Noël Regney, who later claimed that he had co-written "Dominique." Later that same year she was sent by her order to take theology courses at the University of Louvain. She liked the student life, if not her courses.

Effects of fame and further musical career 
Deckers did not see much money from her international fame, and her second album, Her Joys, Her Songs, received little attention and disappeared almost as soon as it was released in 1964. Most of her earnings were taken by Philips and her producer, while the rest automatically went to her religious congregation, which earned at least $100,000 in royalties.

In 1966, a biographical film loosely based on Sister Luc Gabriel was released called The Singing Nun and starring Debbie Reynolds in the central role. Sister Luc Gabriel reportedly rejected the film as "fiction".

Pulled between two worlds and increasingly in disagreement with the Catholic Church, Deckers left her convent in 1966 to pursue a life as a lay Dominican instead. She later reported that her departure resulted from a personality clash with her superiors, that she had been forced out of the convent and did not leave of her own free will. Convent superiors denied the other nuns contact with her as she was described as a "bad influence". After she left, however, she continued to adhere as closely as she could to the disciplines of the convent, still considering herself a nun, praying several times daily, and maintaining a simple and chaste lifestyle.

When she left the convent, her record company made her give up her professional names,  "Sœur Sourire" and "The Singing Nun". She attempted to continue her musical career under the name "Luc Dominique". Increasingly frustrated at what she perceived to be the Catholic Church's failure to fully implement the reforms of the Second Vatican Council, she released a song in 1967 defending the use of contraception, called "Glory be to God for the Golden Pill". This led to an intervention by the Catholic hierarchy in Montreal, Quebec, Canada, and one of her concerts was cancelled. Several major tour venues subsequently cancelled, and the tour was effectively derailed. In 1968, Deckers turned to publishing, writing a book of inspirational verse, but that, too, failed to gain an audience.

Deckers went on to release an album titled I Am Not a Star in Heaven and developed a repertoire of religious songs and songs for children. Despite her renewed emphasis on music, Deckers' career failed to prosper. She blamed the album's failure on not being able to use the names by which she had become known, saying that "nobody knew who it was." When a second single, "Sister Smile Is Dead",  also failed, Deckers turned to teaching disabled youngsters in Wavre, Belgium, eventually opening her own school for autistic children. She eventually suffered a nervous breakdown, which was followed by two years of psychotherapy.

Relationship with Annie Pécher 
She reconnected with a friend from her youth, Annie Pécher, while at the University of Louvain. The two slowly developed a very close relationship, and would share an apartment until their deaths.

Exasperated by speculation that she and Pécher were in a lesbian relationship, she wrote:
People at my record company think that two women who live together must be lesbians. They assert even that nuns in convents are in love. I deny these rumors as I testify against every creepy spirit. The answer is still obvious that I am not homosexual. I am loyal and faithful to Annie, but that is a whole other love in the Lord. Anyone who cannot understand this can go to the devil!

Biographer Catherine Sauvat asserts that despite this denial, Deckers did go on subsequently to have a sexual relationship with Pécher, though only after several years of life together.

Later years 
In 1973, Deckers became involved with the Catholic Charismatic Renewal.  Cardinal Suenens requested that she write songs for the movement, and this led to a brief but successful return to the stage, including a visit to Pittsburgh, Pennsylvania, where she sang before several thousand people. Under the name "Sister Smile", she released another album in 1979, which she described as containing "honest, religious songs" commenting that the album would help listeners to "know who I really am."

In the late 1970s, the Ministry of Finance of Belgium said that she owed $63,000 in back taxes. Deckers countered that the royalties from her recording were given to her convent and therefore she was not liable for payment of any personal income tax. She then called on her former convent and her former record label, Philips. The sisters gave her what they considered to be her share (which enabled her to acquire an apartment in Wavre, Brabant) on condition that she stop denigrating the congregation and sign a document stating that all accounts were balanced, but Philips, which had received 95% of the revenue, did nothing. Deckers ran into heavy financial problems. In 1982, she tried, once again as Sœur Sourire, to score a hit with a disco synthesizer version of "Dominique", but this last attempt to resume her singing career failed. In addition to the other financial worries, the autism centre for children started by Deckers and Pécher had to close its doors for financial reasons in 1982. After this, Deckers tried to make a living by giving lessons in music and religion.

Death 
Citing their financial difficulties, she and Annie Pécher died by suicide by taking overdoses of barbiturates and alcohol on 29 March 1985. In their suicide note, they wrote that they had not given up their faith and wished to be buried together with the funeral rite of the Catholic Church. They were buried together on 4 April 1985 in Cheremont Cemetery in Wavre, Brabant, the town where they died. The inscription on their tombstone reads, "J'ai vu voler son âme/ A travers les nuages" (English: "I saw her soul fly through the clouds"),  a line taken from her 1966 song "Luc Dominique".

In popular culture

Books 

  (Sister Smile. It contains excerpts from the diaries. Diary of a Tragedy).

Theatre 

In 1996, The Tragic and Horrible Life of the Singing Nun premiered Off-Broadway at the Grove Street Playhouse. The play, which was written and directed by Blair Fell, was loosely based on events in Deckers' life. The production featured several musical numbers and followed the life of the title character, renamed Jeanine Fou, from her entry into the convent until her death with Pécher. The New York Times review stated the play "milks much of its comic mileage from the incongruous, and willfully tasteless, pairing of its holy setting and its trashy, Jacqueline Susann-style dialogue ... In dressing up despair in barbed frivolity, Mr. Fell provides his own skewed equivalent of tragic catharsis." The Catholic League spoke out publicly against the production.

In 2006, a musical version of Fell's play was staged during the New York Musical Theatre Festival, produced by George DeMarco and David Gerard, both of whom produced the 1996 production. Laura Daniel played Jeanine and received the NYMF Award for Outstanding Individual Performance. The musical featured music and lyrics by Andy Monroe and a book by Fell (who also contributed additional lyrics); it was directed by Michael Schiralli.

Films 

The Singing Nun is a 1966 American semi-biographical film, directed by Henry Koster and with a screenplay by John Furia and Sally Benson. Based loosely on Deckers' life to that point in time, it stars Debbie Reynolds in the title role and also features Greer Garson, Ricardo Montalbán, Agnes Moorehead, Katharine Ross, Chad Everett, and Ed Sullivan as himself.

In 2009, Sœur Sourire, a Franco-Belgian biopic starring Belgian actress Cécile de France as Deckers, was released. The film won the Magritte Award for Best Costume Design.

Discography

Albums 
The Singing Nun (1963, Philips PCC 203)
Her Joys, Her Songs (1964, Philips, PCC 209)
I Am Not a Star in Heaven
Chansons d'enfants (2014)

Compilations
Best of Sœur Sourire (2003)
Sœur Sourire, Volumes 1, 2 and 3 (2009)
Sœur Sourire Sings – The Masterpieces (2021)

References

Further reading 
  (a novel)

External links 

 
 [ The Singing Nun] at AllMusic
 

1933 births
1985 suicides
People from Laeken
20th-century Belgian women singers
20th-century Belgian singers
Belgian guitarists
Philips Records artists
20th-century Belgian Roman Catholic nuns
Burials at Cheremont Cemetery
Dominican Sisters
French-language singers of Belgium
Belgian singer-songwriters
Women singer-songwriters
Drug-related suicides in Belgium
Barbiturates-related deaths
Folk guitarists
Belgian folk singers
Former Roman Catholic religious sisters and nuns
Joint suicides
Roman Catholic writers
Grammy Award winners
20th-century guitarists
Walloon musicians
20th-century women guitarists